All India N.R. Congress (abbr. AINRC) is a regional political party formed by the  Chief Minister of Puducherry, N. Rangaswamy in the Indian union territory of Puducherry. He announced the party formation on 7 February 2011 in the party's head office in Pondicherry as a breakaway from the Indian National Congress. Currently it is part of the National Democratic Alliance led by the BJP currently the ruling party of India.

The official website states expansion of "N.R." in the party's name as Namathu Rajiyam (meaning our kingdom). These letters are also the initials of the party founder N. Rangasamy. The party's official motto is Simplicity, Fairness and Transparency.

2011 Assembly elections
In 2011 assembly election, the AINRC is allied with J. Jayalalithaa's All India Anna Dravida Munnetra Kazhagam (AIADMK). Rangasamy formed the government by winning 15 seats in the election without consulting the AIADMK and refusing to share power with the pre-election alliance partner. So Jayalalithaa accused Rangasamy of betraying the coalition. On 18 May 2015, it was announced that Congress MLA Malladi Krishna Rao is likely to quit the party and formalise his association with the AINRC, taking the strength of the serving party to 15.

2014 Lok Sabha election
Chief Minister N Rangaswamy announced that R. Radhakrishnan, former Speaker of Puducherry Assembly, would be the AINRC candidate for the Puducherry constituency for 2014 Lok Sabha Election. Radhakrishnan won the lone Lok Sabha seat from Puducherry.

2016 Assembly elections
AINRC won 8 seats in the 2016 Puducherry Legislative Assembly election while Congress has emerged as the single largest party with 15 seats. Therefore, Congress, along with Dravida Munnetra Kazhagam which won 2 seats,  forms government.

2021 Assembly elections
AINRC along with BJP won a clear majority of seats in the 2021 Puducherry Legislative Assembly election which paved way for the NDA to form a government in the Union Territory for the first time.

References

2011 establishments in Puducherry
Indian National Congress breakaway groups
Member parties of the National Democratic Alliance
Political parties established in 2011
Populist parties
Recognised state political parties in India
Social democratic parties in India
State political parties in Puducherry
All India N.R. Congress